Earl Eugene Naylor (May 19, 1919 – January 16, 1990) was an American outfielder and pitcher in Major League Baseball for the Brooklyn Dodgers and Philadelphia Phillies. He played from 1942 to 1946. From 1944 to 1945 Naylor served in the United States Navy during World War II.

Naylor became a manager in the minor leagues at the end of his career, for the Union City Dodgers of the KITTY League in 1953 and 1954 and the Asheville Tourists of the Tri-State League in 1955.

References

External links

1919 births
1990 deaths
United States Navy personnel of World War II
Asheville Tourists managers
Asheville Tourists players
Baseball players from Kansas City, Missouri
Brooklyn Dodgers players
Fayetteville Angels players
Greenville Buckshots players
Major League Baseball outfielders
Philadelphia Phillies players
Rochester Red Wings players
Memphis Chickasaws players
Montreal Royals players
St. Paul Saints (AA) players
Union City Dodgers players
United States Navy sailors